The Lucknow Mail is an Indian Railways train running between Lucknow and New Delhi on a daily basis. It is numbered 12229 when starting from Lucknow and terminating at New Delhi, 12230 between New Delhi and Lucknow. It has received an ISO 9000 certification after Bhopal Express. Lucknow Mail is the first LHB train of Indian Railways running with 24 coaches (22 coaches+2 EOG) on permanent basis. Lucknow Mail also has the maximum number of AC coaches for a non fully-AC train (11 AC Coaches) in India.

Lucknow Mail along with Shram Shakti Express, Prayagraj Express, Shiv Ganga Express enjoys highest priority all over the route

From the Past

Lucknow Mail originally had 29 Up and 30 Down numbers before rationalisation of number schemes. With the new rationalisation scheme the train was assigned with service numbers 4229 from Lucknow and 4230 from New Delhi. In the 2005-06 railway Budget, it was elevated to superfast category without withdrawing any previous intermediate stops. During the tenure of Mamata Banerjee as Railway Minister a new five digit numbering scheme was introduced and present numbers 12229 and 12230 were assigned to Lucknow Mail.

Journey

The down train (#12230) departs New Delhi at 22:05 usually from Platform 16 and reaches Lucknow at 06:45 the following morning. The up train (#12229) departs Lucknow at 22:00 usually from Platform 1 and reaches New Delhi at 06:45 the following morning. The train boarding station was changed on 15/11/2018 from Lucknow Charbagh to Lucknow junction. The Time table is as follows:

12229 Lucknow Junction railway station to New Delhi

'''12230 New Delhi to Lucknow Junction railway station

Coaches
Coach Composition are as follows-

12229 LKO NDLS Loco-EOG-GEN-GEN-S1-S2-S3-S4-S5-S6-S7-S8-M1-M2-B1-B2-B3-B4-A1-A2-A3-A4-HA1-H1-EOG

12230 NDLS LKO Loco-EOG-H1-HA1-A4-A3-A2-A1-B4-B3-B2-B1-M2-M1-S8-S7-S6-S5-S4-S3-S2-S1-GEN-GEN-EOG

Loco in-charge for this train is WAP-7,WAP-4, WAP 5 from Ghaziabad, Uttar Pradesh (GZB) shed.

See also

 New Delhi railway station
 Lucknow Charbagh railway station

References 

Transport in Delhi
Rail transport in Delhi
Passenger trains originating from Lucknow
Mail trains in India